Justin Marozzi (born 1970) is an English journalist, historian and travel writer.

Biography
Marozzi studied at Cambridge University, where he gained a Starred Double First in History in 1993. He has also earned degrees in broadcast journalism from Cardiff University and in international relations from the University of Pennsylvania as a Thouron Scholar. As a journalist, he worked for the BBC, the Financial Times and the Economist. 
 
Marozzi has published six books: South from Barbary (2001) is an account of his explorations through the Libyan Sahara; Tamerlane: Sword of Islam, Conqueror of the World (2004) was a highly regarded biography of the Mongol conqueror Timur and was listed as a Sunday Telegraph Book of the Year; Faces of Exploration (2006), an account of famous explorers, was followed by The Man Who Invented History: Travels with Herodotus (2008), a biography of the world's first historian; Baghdad: City of Peace, City of Blood (2014); and Islamic Empires - Fifteen Cities that Define a Civilization (2019).

Marozzi was a Fellow of the Royal Geographical Society.

Awards and honors
2015 Ondaatje Prize for Baghdad: City of Peace, City of Blood

References

External links
 Justin Marozzi's website

English historians
English people of Italian descent
1970 births
Living people